Servando Cabrera Moreno (1923–1981) was a Cuban painter.  A supporter of the Cuban Revolution, he created many paintings that depict the Cuban peasantry. Stylistically, his paintings are rooted in the tradition of vanguardia, and are especially indebted to the work of Carlos Enríquez Gómez.

Servando Cabrera Moreno was born in Havana on May 28, 1923. He graduated from the San Alejandro Academy after completing studies at the Art Student's League in NY and La Grande Chaumière in Paris. His first individual exhibition took place at the Lyceum, Havana in 1943. He has also participated in many biennials in Venice, Mexico City and São Paulo as well as other collective exhibitions. Cabrera Moreno has received a number of prizes at Cuban salons: a gold medal at the Panamerican Tampa Exhibition and silver medal at the International Joan Miró Drawing Contest in Barcelona. His work can be found throughout the world in museums, galleries and private collections.

References

Veerle Poupeye. Caribbean Art.  London; Thames and Hudson; 1998.

1923 births
1981 deaths
20th-century Cuban painters
20th-century Cuban male artists
People from Havana
Male painters